St Martin-in-the-Fields High School for Girls is one of the oldest schools for girls in Britain. It was established in 1699 as a charitable enterprise by the parish of St Martin-in-the-Fields. Its popularity and growth led to its relocation in 1928 on a larger site in Tulse Hill, in the South London borough of Lambeth, England. For most of its history it was a grammar school, but it is now a secondary school with academy status.

History
The school was founded by the parish of St Martin-in-the-Fields in 1699 as a charity. Those who ran the parish at the time, and the Society for Promoting Christian Knowledge, were considered radical, for their notion that there should be a local school for girls as well as boys.

The school was originally in Charing Cross Road, near the St. Martin-in-the-Fields church. It was known as St Martin's Middle Class School for Girls, and only later became known as St Martin-in-the-Fields High School for Girls. Parish endowments thus made possible the education of girls. The school did well and grew, in what was a populous fast-growing parish. By the early twentieth century growth was such that a bigger building with proper grounds and playing fields became necessary. The school relocated to its present site in 1928. The nearby Strand School had fifteen years earlier moved to the same area for similar reasons. St Martins' new buildings were officially opened by the then Duchess of York, wife of the future King George VI, better known in later decades as the Queen Mother.

In 1999, her majesty Elizabeth II took part in the school celebrations of its tercentenary.

The school maintains close links with its founding church in Trafalgar Square.

The school has a long-standing exchange link with Anchovy High School, Anchovy, near Montego Bay, Jamaica.

The school badge depicts the eponymous St. Martin of Tours. The school motto Caritate et disciplina translates as "With Love and Learning". The school remains Christian but accepts girls of all faiths.
the school is getting closed down now 2023 they can not afford another set of year 7s CHAI what a downfall on one of the oldest schools in england

Performance
St Martins' is in the top 5%  of similar schools in England, despite having a low turnout in grades during 2011–2013. It has recently had a decline in results and the level of achievement has also suffered in the recent years. The school today serves a catchment area in which an estimated 36% receive free school meals, and where a high percentage are lone parents. Almost 90% of the school's pupils are of Caribbean or African extraction, with an estimated 27% speaking English as an additional language. St Martin's has in recent years won the Lambeth Debating competition four times in a row. It was given technology college status In 1996. St. Martin's has been awarded a Sportsmark and has been identified as an Ambassador School for Gifted and Talented Youth.

Notable former pupils
 Skin (musician)

Grammar school
 Carol Barnes
 Christine Bicknell CBE
 Gloria Craig CB, Director from 2007 to 2011 of International Security Policy at the Ministry of Defence
 Monica Pidgeon, interior designer and writer
 Lynn Trickett, graphic designer, formed the well-known Trickett & Webb advertising agency with Brian Webb in 1971

See also
 List of the oldest schools in the United Kingdom

Further reading
D. H. Thomas. A Short History of St Martin-in-the-Fields High School for Girls (1929)

References

External links
Official Site
Ambassador Schools
St Martin-in-the-Fields Old Girls Association

Secondary schools in the London Borough of Lambeth
Girls' schools in London
1699 establishments in England
Educational institutions established in the 1690s
Academies in the London Borough of Lambeth
Church of England secondary schools in the Diocese of Southwark